Piesma is a genus of ash-grey leaf bugs, insects of the family Piesmatidae. It is the type genus of the family.

Description
Piesma bugs are less than 4mm long and can be distinguished from the similar genus Parapiesma by the shape of the pronotum: the side margins have a clearly recognizable notch, which the other lacks.  These insects are usually macropterous (having fully developed wings), but are sometimes brachypterous.

Species
, Lygaeoidea Species File and Fossilworks accept the following species:
Piesma brachialis  – United States
Piesma capitatum  – Asia, Europe
Piesma ceramica   – United States
Piesma costata  – United States
Piesma dilutus  – Botswana
Piesma explanata  – United States
Piesma linnavuorii  – Africa
Piesma maculatum  – Europe, Africa
Piesma marginepicta  – Africa
Piesma patruela  – United States
Piesma protea  – United States
†Piesma rotunda  – United States
Piesma xishaena  – China

References

External links

Piesmatidae
Hemiptera of Africa
Hemiptera of Asia
Hemiptera of Europe
Hemiptera of North America
Pentatomomorpha genera